Panic in Babylon is a 2004 studio album by Lee Perry. He was backed by the all-white and all-Swiss White Belly Rats.

Track listing

Rastafari
Purity Rock
Pussy Man
Fight to the Finish
Voodoo
Panic in Babylon
Perry's Ballad
I am a Psychiatrist
Inspector Gadget 2004
Are You Coming Home?
Baby Krishna
Greetings
Devil Dead Live

References

2004 albums
Lee "Scratch" Perry albums